Grethe Holmer (12 January 1924, in Copenhagen, Denmark – 13 October 2004) was a Danish actress. She performed in the theatre at the Aarhus Teater and numerous other theatres in Denmark later, and in film and in her later years on television.

Filmography
Skilsmissens børn - 1939
Gå med mig hjem - 1941
Forellen - 1942
Når man kun er ung - 1943
Det brændende spørgsmål - 1943
Elly Petersen - 1944
Det bødes der for - 1944
En ny dag gryer - 1945
Diskret ophold - 1946
Så mødes vi hos Tove - 1946
Hr. Petit - 1948
De røde heste - 1950
Mosekongen - 1950
Bag de røde porte - 1951
Det gamle guld - 1951
Det store løb - 1952
Fløjtespilleren - 1953
Himlen er blå - 1954
Mod og mandshjerte - 1955
Gymnasiepigen - 1960
Med kærlig hilsen - 1971
Honning Måne - 1978
Sort høst - 1993
Farligt venskab - 1995
Kun en pige - 1995
Kat (film) - 2001

External links

Danish stage actresses
Danish film actresses
Danish television actresses
Place of death missing
Actresses from Copenhagen
1924 births
2004 deaths